The Graves Battery, which had 73 troops and was led by Major Rice E. Graves Jr., was a part of the First Kentucky C Company, led by General John C. Breckinridge. This company was, in turn, a component of the First Kentucky Brigade, nicknamed the "Orphan Brigade".

West Point Cadet

Major Rice Evan Graves Jr., was attending the United States Military Academy at West Point, New York, on a Presidential appointment recommended by the Kentucky second congressional district representative Samuel O. Peyton, when he resigned to join the Confederate Army at Camp Boone in Saint Bethlehem, Tennessee now incorporated and merged into Clarksville, Tennessee, according to documents on file at the United States Military Academy at West Point, New York.  Graves was born in Virginia and raised near Yelvington, Kentucky, about 12 miles east of Owensboro, Kentucky on KY Hwy 144.

The Fort Donelson National Battlefield, maintained by the U.S. National Park Service at Dover, Tennessee has a large section of the battlefield named in honor of Major Graves entitled "Graves Battery".

Battles

Major Graves led his battery into many battles such as the Battle at Fort Donelson-in Dover, Tennessee; Fortification for the defense of Bowling Green, Kentucky; Battle of Stones River at Murfreesboro, Tennessee where he was wounded in action twice; Battle of Shiloh; Defense of Vicksburg, 1862; Siege of Jackson, Mississippi; Atlanta Campaign; Battle of Stockbridge; Oconee River Bridge; South Carolina Campaign; Surrender at Washington, Georgia.  Major Graves was killed in action at the Battle of Chickamauga in Georgia.

See also

 List of Kentucky Civil War Confederate units
 List of Kentucky Civil War Units
 Kentucky in the Civil War

External links
National Park Service site

People from Daviess County, Kentucky
Units and formations of the Confederate States Army from Kentucky
Orphan Brigade
Artillery units and formations of the American Civil War
1861 establishments in Tennessee
Military units and formations established in 1861